Nezihe Kalkan (born April 15, 1979), better known as Nez, is a Turkish singer and dancer known for her modern-oriental hybrid dancing style combined with techno-inspired pop music.

She spent a long time in the UK for education and after returning to her home country in early 2000s, she started performing regularly in a renowned jazz club in Istanbul with a unique show. She was an actor in the Fox Turkey's sitcom Sıkı Dostlar ("good friends") with Haluk Bilginer and Özkan Uğur.

Discography 
Albums
 Sakın Ha (2002)
 %100 (2006)

EPs
 Nez Zamanı (2011)
 Nez & Retro Turca (2014)

References

External links 
 
 Official Website

1979 births
Living people
Turkish folk-pop singers
Turkish pop singers
Musicians from İzmir
21st-century Turkish singers
21st-century Turkish women singers